Stephen K. Weeks (born June 30, 1958) is a Canadian former professional ice hockey goaltender. Weeks played 13 seasons in the National Hockey League (NHL) with the New York Rangers, Hartford Whalers, Vancouver Canucks, New York Islanders, Los Angeles Kings, and Ottawa Senators. Weeks was drafted by the Rangers in the 1978 NHL Amateur Draft and made his NHL debut with the Rangers in 1981. Internationally, he played for the Canadian national team at the 1985 World Championships, winning a silver medal.

Playing career
Weeks was born in Scarborough, Ontario. As a youth, he played in the 1971 Quebec International Pee-Wee Hockey Tournament with a minor ice hockey team from Toronto. The New York Rangers drafted Weeks in the 11th round, 176th overall in the 1978 NHL Entry Draft out of Northern Michigan University.

New York Rangers
Weeks turned pro in 1980, and spent the majority of the 1980–81 season with the New Haven Nighthawks of the American Hockey League (AHL), where he posted a 14–17–3 record with a 4.13 GAA and a shutout in 36 games with the team.  Weeks made his NHL debut on April 2, 1981, holding the powerful New York Islanders to only two goals in a 2–1 loss. Weeks also appeared in a playoff game with the Rangers, allowing no goals in 14 minutes of ice time.

In 1981–82, under new head coach Herb Brooks, Weeks became the Rangers' starting goaltender, leading New York with a 23–16–9 record with a 3.77 GAA and a shutout in 49 games, leading the club into the playoffs. However Weeks struggled in the post-season, and lost his job to Eddie Mio, as the Rangers lost to the New York Islanders in the Patrick Division finals.

Weeks' playing time decreased in 1982–83, and he appeared in just 18 games for the Rangers, going 9–5–3 with a 3.91 GAA. Weeks also saw some action with the Tulsa Oilers of the Central Hockey League (CHL), earning a record of 8–10–0 in 19 games with a 3.23 GAA.

Weeks once again saw some time with Tulsa in 1983–84, appearing in three games, going 3–0–0 with a 2.33 GAA in three games. He spent the majority of the 1983-84 NHL season as Glen Hanlon's backup with the Rangers, with a 10–11–2 record with a 3.97 GAA and a save percentage of .865.

On September 5, 1984, the Rangers traded Weeks to the Hartford Whalers for future considerations, which later became the Whalers' third round draft pick in the 1986 NHL Entry Draft.

Hartford Whalers
Weeks became the Whalers' backup goaltender for the 1984–85 season, first to Greg Millen, then to Mike Liut, after Millen and Liut were traded for each other. In 23 games, Weeks led the Whalers with two shutouts, and overall posted a 9–12–2 record with a 3.91 GAA and a .870 save percentage. Weeks also saw some time with the Binghamton Whalers of the AHL, earning a 5–0–0 record with a 2.57 GAA in five games with the team.

Weeks backed up Liut in 1985–86, going 13–13–0 with a 3.85 GAA and a .863 save percentage in 27 games with the Whalers. Weeks appeared in four playoff games with the team, going 1–2 with a 2.84 GAA in three games, as the Whalers lost to the Montreal Canadiens in the Adams Division finals.

In 1986–87, Weeks appeared in 25 games, going 12–8–2 with a 3.42 GAA and .873 save percentage. He also appearing in one playoff game, going 0–0 with a 1.67 GAA in 36 minutes of playing time.

Weeks began the 1987–88 season with the Whalers, going 6–7–2 in 18 games, with a 3.59 GAA and .858 save percentage. On March 8, 1988, the Whalers traded Weeks to the Vancouver Canucks for Richard Brodeur.

Vancouver Canucks
Weeks saw increased playing time when he joined the Canucks, appearing in nine games for Vancouver, posting a 4–3–2 record and a 3.38 GAA in nine games.

In 1988–89, Weeks appeared in 35 games, his highest total since 1981–82 with the Rangers. Weeks earned a record of 11–19–5 with a 2.98 GAA and .893 save percentage with the Canucks, splitting his playing time with Kirk McLean. The Canucks qualified for the post-season, and in three playoff games against the Calgary Flames, Weeks earned a 1–1 record with a 3.43 GAA and .899 save percentage as the Canucks lost in seven games.

Weeks saw his playing time diminish in 1989–90, playing in only 21 games, and struggled to a 4–11–4 record with a 4.15 GAA, as Vancouver missed the playoffs.

In 1990–91, Weeks appeared in only one game with Vancouver, going 0–1–0 with a 6.10 GAA. He spent the rest of the season with the Milwaukee Admirals of the AHL, as he recorded a 16–19–0 record in 37 games with a 3.78 GAA. In three playoff games with Milwaukee, Weeks had a 1–2 record and a 3.71 GAA.

On March 5, 1991, the Canucks traded Weeks to the Buffalo Sabres for future considerations. After the trade, he remained with the Milwaukee Admirals, and was granted free agency after the season.

Final seasons
Weeks signed with the New York Islanders on September 16, 1991, and became the Islanders back-up goaltender for the 1991–92 season. In 23 games with the Islanders, Weeks put together a solid 9–4–2 record with a 3.60 GAA and a .890 save percentage. On February 18, 1992, the Islanders traded Weeks to the Los Angeles Kings for the Kings' seventh round draft pick in the 1992 NHL Entry Draft.

Weeks finished the 1991-92 season with the Kings, playing in seven games, going 1–3–0 with a 4.05 GAA and a .875 save percentage.

After the season, Weeks became a free agent, and on June 16, 1992, he signed with the Washington Capitals. Less than two months later, on August 13, 1992, the Capitals traded Weeks to the expansion Ottawa Senators for future considerations.

In seven games with Ottawa in 1992–93, Weeks had a 0–5–0 record with a 7.23 GAA and a .792 save percentage.  His struggles continued when he played in the minors, as in six games with the New Haven Senators of the AHL, Weeks went 0–6–0 with a 5.94 GAA.

On February 20, 1993, Weeks announced his retirement from the NHL.

International career

Weeks represented Canada at the 1985 World Ice Hockey Championships held in Prague, Czechoslovakia. In five games, Weeks had a 3–1–1 record with a 2.04 GAA, helping Canada win the silver medal.

Coaching career

Hartford Whalers/Carolina Hurricanes
Weeks became the Whalers goaltending consultant following his retirement on February 20, 1993. Weeks remained in the organization until 2001, mostly as a goaltending coach, however, he was an assistant coach for the club in 1996–97.

Atlanta Thrashers
Weeks was an assistant coach with the Atlanta Thrashers from 2001–2010. He was originally hired by the Thrashers on June 26, 2001, as an assistant to head coach Curt Fraser. During his tenure with the club, the Thrashers earned their first ever playoff berth in 2007.

Chicago Blackhawks
Weeks became the Blackhawks goaltending coach on August 12, 2013.

Personal life
Weeks currently has three children, one of whom who is now married, living in Florida.  He has two brothers and one sister, three nephews and three nieces from his siblings, all living in Canada.

Career statistics

Regular season and playoffs

International

Awards and honours

References

External links

Profile at hockeydraftcentral.com

1958 births
Living people
Atlanta Thrashers coaches
Binghamton Whalers players
Canadian ice hockey goaltenders
Carolina Hurricanes coaches
Chicago Blackhawks coaches
Hartford Whalers coaches
Hartford Whalers players
Los Angeles Kings players
New Haven Nighthawks players
New York Islanders players
New York Rangers draft picks
New York Rangers players
Northern Michigan Wildcats men's ice hockey players
Ottawa Senators players
Sportspeople from Scarborough, Toronto
Ice hockey people from Toronto
Toronto Marlboros players
Tulsa Oilers (1964–1984) players
Vancouver Canucks players
Canadian expatriate ice hockey players in the United States
Canadian ice hockey coaches